The 2013 VSI Tampa Bay FC season was the club's only season of existence. The club played in the USL Pro, the third tier of American soccer.

Competitions

Preseason

USL Pro

U.S. Open Cup

Standings

References 

VSI Tampa Bay FC seasons
2013 USL Pro season
Vsi Tampa Bay Fc
VSI Tampa Bay FC